Márcio Gama Moreira (born July 9, 1984 in Fortaleza), is a Brazilian football left-back known as Panda who currently plays for Porto Velho.

External links
  Ogol
  Soccerway
  Brasoccer

1984 births
Living people
Association football forwards
Brazilian footballers
Santa Cruz Futebol Clube players
Association football midfielders
ABC Futebol Clube players
Associação Desportiva Recreativa e Cultural Icasa players
Guarany Sporting Club players
Campinense Clube players
Treze Futebol Clube players
Grêmio Recreativo Serrano players
Centro Sportivo Alagoano players
Manaus Futebol Clube players
Clube Recreativo e Atlético Catalano players
Sportspeople from Fortaleza